Leonard Bridgman (1895–1980) was a British artist and the editor of Jane's All the World's Aircraft from 1941 to 1959.

First assignment
Bridgman's first assignment in aviation was in 1913 at the age of 18 years. One of his drawings was used to illustrate the Hendon Air Race program. As payment, he received a flight in a 70-horsepower Maurice Farman biplane.

Career in the army
During the First World War, Bridgman served as an officer in the Honourable Artillery Company.

Journalism career
He is best remembered within the aviation industry as the journalist who joined C G Grey in 1923 on the staff of Jane's All the World's Aircraft after working on the staff at The Aeroplane.

Career as an editor
Bridgman also edited a book by the name of Esso Air World from 1939 to 1963.

Awards
In 1956, in recognition of his contribution to technology, principally his work on Jane's All the World's Aircraft, Bridgman was awarded a Paul Tissandier Diploma by the Federation Aeronautique Internationale. By that time, he had been associated with flying and publishing for 43 years.

Career as an artist
Bridgman was also a talented artist and produced many aviation paintings, wash drawings and illustrations. He received commissions for numerous advertisements for British companies and illustrated Oliver Stewart's text for The Clouds Remember, one of the classics of aviation literature.

British draughtsmen
British illustrators
20th-century British painters
British male painters
1895 births
1980 deaths
20th-century British male artists